Kyunglung (also Khyunglung, Qulong or Qulongcun) is a village in the Tibet Autonomous Region of China. Kyunglung Ngüka "Silver Palace of Garuda Valley", located southwest of Mount Kailash, identified with palaces found in the upper Sutlej Valley, was the capital city of the ancient kingdom of Zhangzhung. Many Tibetologists and theorists suggest that Kyunglung may be what the Zhangzhung people called Tagzig Olmo Lung Ring. However, some ancient Bonpo scriptures refer to today's Tajikistan, as the Shangshung word "Tag-Zig" refers to today's "Ta-jik", and "-istan" is the Persian word applied after Islamic rule. As time of 7th century Tibetan king Songsten Gampo, today's Tajik was under Tibetan rule. The Shamgshung emperor was beheaded when he went to war in Amdo (a region of Tibet corresponding roughly to Qinghai province). Tajik was part of Shangshung history as the buddha of Bon tradition is believed to have come from there.

Ruins
Khyunglung is a complex of caves set in the hills on the north bank of the Sutlej River about 30 km west of the hotsprings and gompa of Tirthapuri and the nearby coal mining town of Moincêr/Montser in the modern Chinese prefecture of Ali/Ngari in the Tibet Autonomous Region (see Gyurme Dorje, Tibet 3rd ed.). There are further ancient ruins on the hilltops above the Bon monastery of Gurugem/Gurugyam which are only 6 km from Tirthapuri. There is very little published about these sites and virtually no archaeological investigations have been carried out.

The caves of Khyunglung are generally small (about 4 square metres) and have a small raised fireplace at the far end. However, almost without exception, they have no chimney and the blackened ceilings indicate that the smoke exited the cave through the only entrance, making them thick with smoke when the fire was in use. Many of the caves are filled with ancient artifacts dating back to the time of the Zhangzhung. These include small stones inscribed with ancient Tibetan script, stone statues of Bon deities, and various vases and pots. There is also no obvious recess for a bed or other storage. It seems that these fires were used for sacrificial offerings and some are still in use today, as the scattering of bones, feathers etc. make clear.

There are no visible springs on site, no water channels or wells and it is therefore probable that water from the river was used. However the caves are downstream of a large sulfurous hot spring and the water in the Sutlej at this point is barely potable (John Snelling, The Sacred Mountain). In addition, the immediate vicinity of the caves show no signs of agriculture – there are no terraces for fields and the grazing land is very poor.

It has been suggested that Kyunglung was never a city as such, but more of a "convention centre for Bonpo magicians", and that the caves were used for ceremonial purposes during times when the clans gathered. Possible camping grounds for the main retinue would be around the modern village of Khyunglung a few kilometres upstream where the valley is somewhat broader, or the area between Gurugem and Tirthapuri which is still heavily used by yak and sheep herding nomads today. The ruins above Gurugem appear to be a more likely site for permanent habitation, but much more study would be needed to establish this.

Present-day
The modern village of Kyunglung lies just upstream from its ancient namesake. It is a tiny community of small households, and the people live and depend heavily on yaks for agriculture and transport. The village itself is very old, and the villagers maintain a way of life that has changed very little in the last hundred years or more. The villagers at Kyunglung follow the ancient religion of Bon, the same religion as their Zhangzhung ancestors.

See also
 List of towns and villages in Tibet

Footnotes

External links
 "Atlantis in the Himalayas" An article by Jürgen Kremb with photo of Khyunglung in Spiegel Online, April 28, 2006. 

Populated places in Tibet
Bon
Asian shamanism
Dzogchen
Religion in Tibet
Tibetan Buddhist places
Ruins in Tibet
Shamanism in Tibet